Musholm is a small island in Denmark. The highest point is 9 meters above sea level.

There is only one house on the island. It is being used by the company Musholm Lax.
It is a popular place for sailors. There is no real harbor, but it's possible to anchor.

References 

Islands of Denmark
Uninhabited islands of Denmark
Geography of Kalundborg Municipality